Homelessness in Washington may refer to:

 Homelessness in Washington (state)
 Homelessness in Washington, D.C.